Baş Küngüt (also, Bash-Kyungyut) is a village and municipality in the Shaki district of Azerbaijan.  It has a population of 1,381. 

The etymology of the name Küngüt in the name of the village comes from the name of the country Kang (Kangar), with a Sogdian plural suffix -t, expressed in the ancient Chinese annals as Guniue.

References

 Zuev Yu.A., "Early Türks: Essays on history and ideology", Almaty, Daik-Press, 2002,  (In Russian) 

Populated places in Shaki District